Eugene Marion Lambert (April 26, 1921 – February 10, 2000) was a pitcher in Major League Baseball. He played for the Philadelphia Phillies. 

Entering professional baseball in 1939, Lambert made his Major League debut on September 14, 1941. His only decision came 10 days later when the Phillies lost to the New York Giants, 2–0, at Shibe Park. He served in the United States Army during World War II from 1943 to 1945. Following his military service, he went back to baseball spending 1946 in the minor leagues.

Lambert died in Germantown, Tennessee, on February 10, 2000, aged 78.

References

External links

1921 births
2000 deaths
Philadelphia Phillies players
Major League Baseball pitchers
Baseball players from Mississippi
Mayodan Millers players
Pensacola Pilots players
Milwaukee Brewers (minor league) players
Syracuse Chiefs players
Memphis Chickasaws players
Gadsden Pilots players
United States Army personnel of World War II